Dirty Gold is an American band from San Diego, California. The band was founded by brothers John and Lincoln Ballif. Dirty Gold released their first EP, Roar, on April 12, 2011, on Autumn Tone Records. Lincoln and John Ballif have made brief comebacks in the band "CHIPS", in which John Ballif is the lead singer as opposed to Lincoln. A comeback album either as "CHIPS" or "Dirty Gold" has been rumored but not confirmed by band members. Lincoln has also reportedly been writing original music, although the release date of these songs remains unknown.

Members
 John Ballif
 Lincoln Ballif
 Grant Nassif

Discography

EPs
 Roar (2011)

References

External links
 Dr. Dog : MySpace
 Dirty Gold on Facebook
 Dirty Gold on Twitter
 Dirty Gold on Myspace
 Dirty Gold on Soundcloud

Musical groups from San Diego